Battle of Sena Gallica may refer to:

 Battle of Sena Gallica (82 BC), part of the first Roman Civil War where Sulla's forces under Gnaeus Pompeius Magnus defeated their Populares rivals under Gaius Marcius Censorinus
 Battle of Sena Gallica (551), naval battle fought between the Byzantine Empire and the Ostrogothic Kingdom resulting in a Byzantine victory